Oleksandr Lypovyy (born October 9, 1991) is a Ukrainian professional basketball player for Prometey of the Latvian-Estonian Basketball League and EuroCup.

Professional career
In March 2014, Lypovyy signed a contract with the Serbian team Crvena zvezda, for the rest of the season. In September 2014, he returned to Ukraine, and signed with Budivelnyk. In October 2015, he signed with the Georgian team VITA Tbilisi. 

On November 10, 2015, he left Tbilisi and signed with the Hungarian club Szolnoki Olaj, for the rest of the season. In late February 2016, he left Szolnoki and signed with the Ukrainian club Dynamo Kyiv, for the rest of the season. In September 2016, he signed with the Greek team Aries Trikala, for the 2016–17 season.

On July 14, 2017, he signed with the Greek club Promitheas Patras. On July 4, 2019, Lypovyy renewed his contract with Promitheas through 2021. After the end of the 2019-20 season, Lypovyy refused to reduce his wages with Promitheas, and eventually, the team terminated his contract.

National team career
Lypovyy has been a member of the senior Ukrainian national basketball team. With the Ukrainian national team, he played at the EuroBasket 2011, the EuroBasket 2013, the EuroBasket 2015, and the EuroBasket 2017. He also played at the 2014 FIBA World Cup

See also
 List of foreign basketball players in Serbia

References

External links
NBA.com Profile
FIBA Profile
EuroCup Profile
Eurobasket.com Profile
Draftexpress.com Profile
NBADraft.com Profile
TheDraftReview.com Profile

1991 births
Living people
2014 FIBA Basketball World Cup players
ABA League players
Aries Trikala B.C. players
Basketball League of Serbia players
BC Budivelnyk players
BC Donetsk players
BC Kyiv players
BC Prometey players
Greek Basket League players
KK Crvena zvezda players
Point guards
Promitheas Patras B.C. players
Shooting guards
Small forwards
Sportspeople from Kharkiv
Szolnoki Olaj KK players
Ukrainian expatriate basketball people in Greece
Ukrainian expatriate basketball people in Serbia
Ukrainian expatriate sportspeople in Georgia (country)
Ukrainian expatriate sportspeople in Hungary
Ukrainian men's basketball players